Barbara Erni (15 February 1743 – 26 February 1785) was a Liechtenstein woman known for stealing from inns throughout western Europe using a confidence trick. Known in Liechtenstein legend as Golden Boos, Erni was the last person to be executed by Liechtenstein.

Erni was born in Feldkirch to a homeless couple. In 1779, she married a Tyrolean, Franz, a man with a reputation for criminal behaviour.

According to the legend, the Golden Boos was a woman with red-blond hair and great strength who travelled throughout the European countryside with a large treasure chest or backpack. Wherever she rested for the night, she would demand that her chest be locked in the best and most secure room available, since she claimed it contained a fabulous treasure. Once the treasure was locked away and night fell, a small man would emerge from the chest or backpack and would gather the valuables from the best room, after which Erni and the man would flee during the night. The scheme worked well for Erni for a number of years, and she became wealthy. The identity of the male assistant is unknown.

Erni and her male accomplice were arrested at Eschen and imprisoned at Vaduz on 27 May 1784. She was tried by Liechtenstein, and she admitted to seventeen thefts using the confidence trick. On 7 December 1784, the court found Erni guilty of being the Golden Boos and sentenced her to death by beheading. She was beheaded in Vaduz before a public audience of approximately 1000 spectators. The fate of the male assistant is unknown.

No one was executed again by Liechtenstein before it abolished the death penalty in 1987.

References

Barbara Greene (1967). Liechtenstein: Valley of Peace (Vaduz: Liechtenstein-Verlag) pp. 20–21.
James Foster Robinson, "The Legend of the Golden Boos", 21 May 2004.

1743 births
1785 deaths
Confidence tricksters
Executed Liechtenstein women
Liechtenstein criminals
People executed for theft
People executed by Liechtenstein by decapitation
Executed Liechtenstein people
18th-century Liechtenstein women
18th-century criminals
People from Vaduz
People from Feldkirch, Vorarlberg